The discography of Mr. Lif, an American hip hop artist from Boston, Massachusetts, consists of three full-length studio albums, two EPs, one live album, two compilation albums and ten singles. Four music videos for his songs have been produced.

Mr. Lif made his recording debut in 1997 with the self-produced song "This Won" on the Boston compilation Rebel Alliance. His debut vinyl single, "Elektro", was released on Nos Productions in 1998. This was followed by two more singles, "Triangular Warfare" and "Farmhand" (both in 1999), released on Brick Records and Beastie Boys' Grand Royal, respectively. Mr. Lif then signed to El-P's Definitive Jux label and released two EPs—Enters the Colossus in 2000 and Emergency Rations in 2002—before releasing his debut full-length, the concept album I Phantom, in 2002. Mr. Lif's second album, Mo' Mega, was released on Definitive Jux in 2006. His third album, I Heard It Today was released in 2009 on Mr. Lif's own label Bloodbot Tactical Enterprises. He has also made many appearances on other artists' tracks and on compilations. Releases with his group The Perceptionists are not included.

Albums

Studio albums
{|class="wikitable"
! rowspan="2" width="33"|Year
! rowspan="2" width="215"|Title
! colspan="3"|Peak chart positions
! rowspan="2"| Notes
|-
!style="width:3em;font-size:75%"|US R&B
!style="width:3em;font-size:75%"|US Heat.
!style="width:3em;font-size:75%"|US Ind.
|-
|align="center"|2002
|I Phantom
Released: September 17, 2002
Label: Definitive Jux (DJX037)
|align="center"|80
|align="center"|20
|align="center"|16
|*Debut full-length solo album.
|-
|align="center"|2006
|Mo' Mega
Released: June 13, 2006
Label: Definitive Jux (DJX129)
|align="center"|—
|align="center"|27
|align="center"|31
|
|-
|align="center"|2009
|I Heard It Today
Released: April 21, 2009
Label: Bloodbot Tactical Enterprises
|align="center"|—
|align="center"|—
|align="center"|—
|
|-
|align="center"|2016
|Don't Look Down
Released: April 15, 2016
Label: Mello Music Group
|align="center"|—
|align="center"|—
|align="center"|—
|
|-
|colspan="6" style="font-size:90%;"|"—" denotes items which were not released in that country or failed to chart.
|}

Live albums
{|class="wikitable"
! width="33"|Year
! width="215"|Title
|-
|align="center"|2002
|Live at the Middle East
Released: January 22, 2002
Label: Ozone Music (OZO88832)
|-
|}

Compilation albums
{|class="wikitable"
! width="33"|Year
! width="300"|Title
! Notes
|-
|align="center"|2003
|Sleepyheads: Unreleased and Hard To Find
Released: October 23, 2003
Label: Thought Wizard Productions (TW001-2)
|*A collection of hard to find and previously unreleased songs.
|-
|align="center"|2007
|Sleepyheads II (Classic Combos)
Released: March 23, 2007
Label: Thought Wizard Productions (TW001-3)
|*A collection of collaborations with other artists.
|-
|align="center"|2008
|Sleepyheads 3
Released: 2008
Label: Thought Wizard Productions
|*A collection of unreleased tracks
|-
|}

Extended plays
{|class="wikitable"
! rowspan="2" width="33"|Year
! rowspan="2" width="215"|Title
! colspan="2"|Peak chart positions
! rowspan="2"|Notes
|-
!style="width:3em;font-size:75%"|US Heat.
!style="width:3em;font-size:75%"|US Ind.
|-
|align="center"|2000
|Enters the Colossus
Released: November 14, 2000
Label: Definitive Jux (DJX003)
|align="center"|—
|align="center"|—
|*Debut EP.
|-
|align="center"|2002
|Emergency Rations
Released: June 25, 2002
Label: Definitive Jux (DJX030)
|align="center"|38
|align="center"|28
|
|-
|}

"—" denotes releases that did not chart.

Singles
{| class="wikitable"
! width="33"|Year
! width="225"|Title
! Album
|-
|align="center"|1998
|"Elektro"
B-Side: "The Nothing"
Label: Nos Productions (NOS001)
|rowspan="3"|non-album single*
|-
|align="center" rowspan="2"|1999
|"Triangular Warfare"
B-Side: "Inhuman Capabilities"
Label: Brick Records (BRK006)
|-
|"Farmhand"
B-Side: "Settle the Score"
Label: Grand Royal (GR085)
|-
|align="center"|2000
|"Front on This"
B-Side: "Be Out"
Label: Definitive Jux (DJX001)
|rowspan="2"|Enters the Colossus
|-
|align="center"|2001
|"Cro-Magnon"
B-Side: "Fulcrum", "Retrospect"
Label: Definitive Jux (DJX004)
|-
|align="center" rowspan="3"|2002
|"Home of the Brave"
B-Side: "The Unorthodox"
Label: Definitive Jux (DJX026)
|Emergency Rations
|-
|"New Man Theme"
B-Side: "Pull Out Your Cut", "Phantom"
Label: Definitive Jux (DJX036)
|rowspan="3"|I Phantom
|-
|"Return of the B-Boy"
Label: Definitive Jux (DJX038)
|-
|align="center"|2003
|"Live from the Plantation"
B-Side: "Return of the B-Boy"
Limited edition picture vinyl
Label: Definitive Jux (DJX045)
|-
|align="center"|2006
|"Brothaz"
B-Side: "Brothaz" (9th Wonder Remix)
Label: Definitive Jux (DJX131)
|Mo' Mega
|-
|}

*Later collected on Sleepyheads: Unreleased and Hard To Find.

Music videos
{|class="wikitable"
! width="33"|Year
! Song
! Director
|-
|align="center"|2001
|"Because They Made It That Way"
|Ethan Lader
|-
|align="center" rowspan="2"|2002
|"Live from the Plantation"
|Ian Levasseur
|-
|"Return of the B-Boy"
|Plates Animation
|-
|align="center"|2006
|"Brothaz"
|Andrew Gura
|-
|align="center"|2009
|"The Sun"
|Luis Servera
|-
|align="center"|2013
|"Boston Strong"
|Ethan Goldhammer
|-
|}

As featured artist

Guest appearances

* not to be confused with the London-based Drum and Bass producer of the same name

Production credits

Appearances on compilations

See also
Definitive Jux discography

References

General

Specific

External links

Mr. Lif at Definitive Jux

Hip hop discographies
Discographies of American artists